Rear Admiral Jens Gunnar Peter Nykvist (born 23 August 1968) is a Swedish Navy officer. Nykvist senior commands include commanding officer of the 1st Submarine Flotilla and the Maritime Component Command. He served as the Chief of Navy from 2016 to 2020. Nykvist currently serves in the Ministry of Defence.

Career
Nykvist was born in Stockholm, Sweden. Nykvist enlisted at Berga Naval Base south of Stockholm in 1987 and began his career on the submarine  in 1988. He has served aboard three different submarine classes: Sjöormen, Västergötland and Gotland. Nykvist was stationed at the Naval Base Point Loma from 2005 to 2007 when the submarine HSwMS Gotland was leased by the United States Navy. Back in Sweden, Nykvist studied at the Swedish National Defence College in Stockholm from 2007 to 2009 and then served as Chief of Staff at the Submarine Flotilla. In 2011 he served in the Swedish Armed Forces Headquarters as Assistant Chief of Staff at the Joint Strategy and Operational Staff.

In 2013 he graduated from the Naval Command College at the Naval War College in the United States. Nykvist then became head of naval operations at the J3 Department of the Joint Strategy and Operational Staff. On 1 December 2013 he was promoted to captain and was appointed commanding officer of the 1st Submarine Flotilla. Nykvist was then the EU Naval Force Chief of Staff during Operation Atalanta in the Gulf of Aden from April until September 2015 and back in Sweden he continued being the commander of the 1st Submarine Flotilla until 2016. On 4 May 2016, Nykvist was appointed Chief of Navy and was promoted to rear admiral. He held the position for almost four years when he was succeeded by Rear Admiral Ewa Skoog Haslum on 1 February 2020. Nykvist is from 1 February 2020 posted to the Ministry of Defence. From September 2020, Nykvist serves as Swedish Military Representative to the EU and NATO in Brussels. In March 2022, Nykvist was appointed co-chair of the NATO Partner Interoperability Advocacy Group.

Nykvist also holds an MA in international relations from Salve Regina University in Newport, Rhode Island, USA.

Personal life
Nykvist is married to Ulrika and together they have two children.

Dates of rank
2013 – Captain
2016 – Rear admiral

Awards and decorations
   For Zealous and Devoted Service of the Realm
   Swedish Armed Forces Conscript Medal
   Swedish Armed Forces International Service Medal
   European Security and Defence Policy Service Medal – EUNAVFOR ATALANTA
  Naval Cross of Merit (Merivoimien ansioristin)

Honours
Member of the Royal Swedish Society of Naval Sciences (2014)

References

Living people
1968 births
Swedish Navy rear admirals
Members of the Royal Swedish Society of Naval Sciences
Military personnel from Stockholm